The Volkswagen Group MLB platform is the company's platform strategy, announced in 2012, for shared modular construction of its longitudinal, front-engined automobiles.

It was developed by Audi and first introduced in 2007 on the Audi A5 then, chronologically, on the Audi A4, Audi Q5, Audi A8, Audi A7, Audi A6, Porsche Macan and the second generation Audi Q7 (MLB Evo). Until 2015, only Audi and Porsche were using the MLB platform. In February 2016 Volkswagen introduced the MLB based Phideon luxury sedan built and sold uniquely in the Chinese market.

Volkswagen Group markets the strategy under the code name MLB, which stands for Modularer Längsbaukasten, translating from German to "Modular Longitudinal Matrix". MLB is one strategy within VW's overall MB (Modulare Baukasten or modular matrix) program which also includes the similar MQB strategy for its vehicles with transverse engine orientation.

While a model may be said to use an MLB platform, it is not so much a platform per se, but rather a system for introducing rationality across disparate platforms that share engine orientation — regardless of model, vehicle size or brand.  Thus, MLB uses a core "matrix" of components across a wide variety of platforms — for example, sharing a common engine-mounting core for all drivetrains (e.g., gasoline, diesel, natural gas, hybrid and purely electric). The only things that are non-variable are the pedal box, firewall, and front wheel placement, as well as the windscreen angle; other than this, the vehicle can be stretched and shaped to fit any body style, size range, or drivetrain required. As well as reducing weight, the concept allows diverse models, including those from the company's various brands, to be manufactured at the same plant, further saving cost. , former chief of Volkswagen’s Research and Development, called MB a "strategic weapon."

Jalopnik said "the biggest feature is the uniform position of all motors and transmissions" and that "by fitting all motors into the same place (the company) hope(s) to cut down on engineering costs and weight/complexity when porting the car over to other models." The British magazine, Car, said "the idea heralds a return to basic principles of mass production in an industry where over the last 100 years, complexity has spiralled out of control. By creating a standardised, interchangeable set of parts from which to build a variety of cars, (the company) plans to cut the time taken to build a car by 30%."

Modularer Längsbaukasten 
Audi A5 (Typ 8T/8F), 2007–2016
Audi Q5 (Typ 8R), 2008–2017
Audi A4 (B8) (Typ 8K), 2007–2016
Audi A8 (D4) (Typ 4H), 2010–2017
Audi A7 (Typ 4G), 2010–2017
Audi A6 (C7) (Typ 4G), 2011–2018
Porsche Macan (Type 95B), 2013–present
Volkswagen Phideon (Typ 3E), 2016present

Modularer Längsbaukasten Evo

Audi Q7 (Typ 4M), 2015present
Bentley Bentayga (Typ 4V), 2015present
Audi A4 (Typ 8W), 2016present
Audi A5 (Typ 8W6), 2016present
Audi Q5 (Typ 80A), 2017present
Audi A7 (Typ 4K8), 2017present
Audi A8 (Typ 4N), 2017present
Audi A6 (Typ 4K), 2018present
Audi Q8 (Typ 4MN), 2018present
Volkswagen Touareg (Typ CR), 2018present
Audi e-tron (Typ GE), 2018present
Lamborghini Urus, 2018present
Porsche Cayenne (third generation) (Type 9YA), 2018present

See also 
 Volkswagen Group MQB platform
 Volkswagen Group MSB platform
 Volkswagen Group MEB platform
 Volkswagen Group New Small Family platform
 List of Volkswagen Group platforms

References

External links
Volkswagen Group corporate website
Audi corporate website
Volkswagen Phideon press release

Volkswagen Group platforms
Audi